The former High Court Building is a colonial-era building located at No. 89/133 Pansodan Street, between Maha Bandula Garden Street and Pansodan Street in Kyauktada Township, downtown Yangon.

Until 2006, the Supreme Court of Myanmar was located at this complex.

The High Court Building was designed by architect James Ransome, construction of the High Court began in 1905 and was completed in 1911, and is noted for its colonial-era Indo-Saracenic Architecture, including its clock tower and its red-bricked exterior.

The building is listed on the Yangon City Heritage List. Located near Yangon City Hall, the building faces the Independence Monument and the Maha Bandula Park.

Gallery

Notes

References

 Falconer, John; Invernizzi, Luca; Kahrs, Daniel; Moore, Elizabeth; Tettoni, Luca Invernizzi; Birnbaum, Alfred; Cummings, Joe (2000). Burmese design & architecture. Tuttle Publishing. 
 Reid, Robert; Grosberg, Michael (2005). Myanmar (Burma). Lonely Planet. 

Government buildings in Myanmar
Government buildings completed in 1911
Former courthouses
Buildings and structures in Yangon
1911 establishments in Burma